This is a list of recreational cycle routes in England.

The Alban Way, Hertfordshire
The Bristol & Bath Railway Path
The Camel Trail, North Cornwall
The Cheshire Cycleway, Cheshire
Clay Trails, Cornwall
Fallowfield Loop, Manchester
 Fledborough Trail (Lincoln - Fledborough), Lincs./Notts.
Great Flat Lode trail, Cornwall
Greensand Cycle Way, Bedfordshire
 The Greenway, Warwickshire
The Greenway, east London
The Ebury Way Cycle Path
High Peak Trail, Derbyshire
Manifold Way, Staffordshire
 Marriott Way, Norfolk
The Milton Keynes redway system
Middlewood Way, Cheshire/Stockport
Mineral Tramway Trails, Cornwall
Monsal Trail, Derbyshire
Nickey Line, Hertfordshire
The Parkland Walk, North London
Reepham Bridle and Cycle Route, Norfolk
Sea to Sea Cycle Route, northern England
Sett Valley Trail, Derbyshire
The Sunshine Trail, Isle of Wight
Tarka Trail, Devon
Tissington Trail, Derbyshire
 The Somerset Levels host a number of designated cycleways.
 Water Rail Way (Kirkstead - Lincoln), Lincolnshire
W2W route, Walney to Wear, northern England
The Way of the Roses, Morecambe, Lancashire to Bridlington, East Riding of Yorkshire.

See also
National Cycle Network
Cycleways in Wales
Cycleways in Scotland
Cycleways in Northern Ireland
List of cycleways
List of cycle routes in London
Segregated cycle facilities

 Chiltern Cycleway